Hypotia decembralis is a species of snout moth in the genus Hypotia. It was described by Patrice J.A. Leraut in 2007 and is known from Namibia.

References

Endemic fauna of Namibia
Moths described in 2007
Hypotiini
Insects of Namibia
Moths of Africa